Events from the year 1589 in the Kingdom of Scotland.

Incumbents
Monarch – James VI

Events
20 August – Anne of Denmark marries James VI by proxy at Kronborg
23 November – James VI and Anne of Denmark marry formally at the Old Bishop's Palace in Oslo
Golf is played on Glasgow Green

Births
9 December – John Fleming, 2nd Earl of Wigtown (died 1650)
William Douglas, 1st Marquess of Douglas (died 1660)
James King, 1st Lord Eythin, soldier (died 1652 in Sweden)
Probable – George Jamesone, portrait painter (died 1644)

Deaths
February
James Halyburton, Protestant reformer (born 1518)
Patrick Lindsay, 6th Lord Lindsay, Confederate (born 1521)
7 September – Jane Kennedy, companion of Mary, Queen of Scots (drowned while making ferry crossing across the Forth to greet the new queen, Anne of Denmark) 
28 December – George Douglas, Bishop of Moray

See also
 Timeline of Scottish history

References

 
Years of the 16th century in Scotland